The 2008 Australian motorcycle Grand Prix was the sixteenth round of the 2008 MotoGP Championship. It took place on the weekend of 3–5 October 2008 at the Phillip Island Grand Prix Circuit.

Race report
The premier class MotoGP race was won by Casey Stoner from pole position. Stoner rode a lights to flag victory ahead of a fast and charging Valentino Rossi who started the race from 12th position on the grid. Nicky Hayden rounded out the podium finishing in a respectable third place.

In the early stages of the race, Stoner and Hayden had a battle that lasted many laps with the two pulling away from the chasing pack, trading fast laps between them. Casey Stoner gradually began to pull away as Hayden's tyres appeared to wear out slightly. Meanwhile, Rossi was charging through the midfield, getting up to 8th position after only the first lap. Rossi quickly disposed of a number of riders in the first few laps, but lost vital time while attempting to overtake his teammate Jorge Lorenzo and former SBK champion James Toseland. Rossi was setting fast lap times but his entertaining battle with these two riders meant he was losing time, and all chances of catching Stoner and Hayden who were riding off into the distance were slowly fading.

After losing the front end going in MG Corner just after Lukey Heights, Rossi lost yet more time. After a few laps he managed to get into the tow behind Toseland and past him going into the long sweeping turn 1. Toseland had no reply and Rossi had his eyes firmly set on catching the leaders. Rossi caught Hayden with only 2 laps to go, but Stoner was simply too far already to be challenged for the win. By this stage of the race, Hayden's rear tyre was very worn as he had not conserved it in the early stages of the race. Rossi pulled a textbook move going into turn 1 on the last lap, Hayden lost ground from here and could not get close enough to attempt to retake second place.

MotoGP classification

250 cc classification

125 cc classification

Championship standings after the race (MotoGP)

Below are the standings for the top five riders and constructors after round sixteen has concluded.

Riders' Championship standings

Constructors' Championship standings

 Note: Only the top five positions are included for both sets of standings.

Notes

References

Australian motorcycle Grand Prix
Australian
Motorcycle
Motorsport at Phillip Island